The Gorkha Kingdom was a member of the Chaubisi rajya, a confederation of 24 states on the Indian subcontinent ruled by the Khas people. In 1743 CE, the kingdom began a campaign of military expansion, annexing several neighbors and becoming present-day Nepal. The Gorkha Kingdom extended to the Marshyangdi River in the west, forming its border with the Kingdom of Lamjung. To the east, the kingdom extended to the Trishuli River, forming its border with the Nepal Mandala. The Gorkha Kingdom was established in 1559 CE by Prince Dravya Shah, second son of King Yasho Brahma Shah of Lamjung. The prince replaced the Khadka chiefs who previously ruled the region.

Origin 
According to legend, one of the earliest Shah rulers was Rishi-raj Rana-Ji, of the Lunar dynasty. He was made the ruler of Chittorgarh and received the title of Bhattarak. The lunar dynasty remained in power for thirteen generations. Then, the Muslim Yavanas took power. The Bhattarak had to abdicate and could only retain his caste family name, Rana-ji. The rajas were titled Rana-Ji for four generations and Rana-ji Rava for a further seventeen generations.

Akbar, the Mughal emperor, (1542-1605) wished to marry the daughter of Fatte Sinha Rana-Ji Rava. Akbar was refused because he was  not a Hindu but from a different religion (namely Islam). This decision led to war. Many Rajputs, including Fatte Sinha Rana-ji Rava, were killed. The survivors of the war were led by Udaybam Rana-Ji Rava. They founded a settlement, Udaipur.

Manmath Rana-Ji Rava went to Ujjain. His son Bhupal Ranaji Rao went to Ridi in the northern hills and in 1495 CE (Saka Era 1417), to Sargha, and then to Khium in Bhirkot. There, he cultivated the land. The new ruler of Khium had sons, Kancha and Micha. Their bartabandha (the taking of the Bharmanical thread) was performed. Plans for the boys to marry the daughters of the Raghuvanshi Rajputs were made. Kancha, the elder son went to Dhor. He conquered Magarat and reigned over Garhon, Sathum and Birkot. Micha, the younger son, went to Nuwakot in the far west and became ruler there.

From Micha, a dynasty of seven rajas commenced in Nuwakot. Kulamandan, the eldest son of Jagdeva, became ruler of Kaski, displacing the local Gurung king. He was favoured and became Shah and succeeded his father. Kalu, the second son was sent to Dura Danda in Lamjung at the people's request to become their king. Kalu was killed by the Sekhant tribe, who were the ancestor of present-day Gurungs. In the 1500s, another son, Yasobramha, became the ruler of Lamjung after he compromised with the Gurungs. The second son of Yasobramha, Dravya Shah conquered the Ghale people of neighbouring Ligligkot, now in Gorkha. Prince Dravya Shah in 1559 CE also replaced the Khadka chiefs then named the newly found kingdom Gorkha.
The ancient name of Gor-kha is derived from Gorakhnath.

List of kings of Gorkha

The following is a list of the ten kings of the Gorkha principality:

Expansion campaign

From 1736, the Gorkhalis engaged in a campaign of expansion begun by King Nara Bhupal Shah, which was continued by his son, King Prithvi Narayan Shah and grandson Prince Bahadur Shah. Over the years, they conquered huge tracts of land to the east and west of Gorkha.

Among their conquests, the most important and valuable acquisition was the wealthy Newar confederacy of Nepal Mandala centered in the Kathmandu Valley. Starting in 1745, the Gorkhalis mounted a blockade in a bid to starve the population into submission, but the inhabitants held out.

The Newars appealed to the British East India Company to help, and in 1767, it sent an expedition under Captain Kinloch which ended in failure. The three Newar capitals of Kathmandu, Lalitpur and Bhaktapur fell to the Gorkhalis between 1768 and 1769. The Gorkhali king subsequently moved his capital to Kathmandu.

In 1788, the Gorkhalis turned their attention north and invaded Tibet. They seized the border towns of Kyirong and Kuti, and forced the Tibetans to pay an annual tribute. When the Tibetans stopped paying it, the Gorkhalis invaded Tibet again in 1791 and plundered the Tashilhunpo Monastery in Shigatse. This time the Chinese army came to Tibet's defence and advanced close to Kathmandu but could not achieve success due to strong counterattack. The anxious Bahadur Shah asked for 10 howitzer mountain guns from the British East India Company. Captain William Kirkpatrick arrived in Kathmandu, however the deal was not made due to unfavorable circumstances for the Gorkhalis. Eventually, the Fu Kanggan was keen to protect his army and the war being resultless was concluded by signing a peace treaty at Betrawati.

A later Nepalese–Tibetan War was fought from 1855 to 1856 in Tibet between the forces of the Tibetan government (Ganden Phodrang, then under administrative rule of the Qing dynasty) and the invading Nepalese army, resulting in the victory of Nepal.

The Gorkha dominion reached its height at the beginning of the 19th century, extending all along the Himalayan foothills from Kumaon and Garhwal in the west to Sikkim in the east. They were made to return much of the occupied territories after their defeat in the Anglo-Nepalese War (1814–1816) .

Gorkha to Nepal

The Gorkha dominion continued to be known as Gorkha Rajya (meaning the Gorkha Kingdom) until the beginning of the 20th century. Historically, the name 'Nepal' referred mainly to Kathmandu valley, the homeland of the Newars. Since the 1930s, the state began using it to refer to the entire country and 'Nepal Khaldo' (Nepal Valley) became 'Kathmandu Valley'. The name Gorkha Sarkar (meaning Gorkha government) was also changed to Nepal government.

Similarly, the Gorkhali language was renamed as Nepali in 1933. The term Gorkhali in the former national anthem entitled "Shreeman Gambhir" was changed to Nepali in 1951. The government newspaper, launched in 1901, is still known as Gorkhapatra (meaning Gorkha gazette).

The Shah dynasty ruled Nepal until 2008 when it became a republic following a people's movement. Today, Gorkha District, roughly corresponding to the old kingdom, is one of the 77 administrative districts of Nepal.

Gurkhas

Not to be confused with the inhabitants of the old Gorkha Kingdom only, the Gurkhas are also military units in the British or the Indian army (where they are known as Gorkhas) enlisted in Nepal and India. Their history goes back to the Anglo-Gorkha War and the Sugauli Treaty of 1816. It allowed the British East India Company to recruit men from the Gorkha kingdom hills to serve as mercenaries.

During World War II (1939–45), a total of 250,280 Gurkhas served in 40 battalions, plus eight Nepalese Army battalions, plus parachute, training, garrison, and porter units. They earned 2,734 bravery awards, and suffered around 32,000 casualties in all theatres.

Gallery

See also 
 Battle of Kathmandu
 Kingdom of Nepal
 List of Hindu empires and dynasties
 Shah dynasty
 Rana dynasty

References 

Gurkhas
History of Nepal
Empires and kingdoms of Nepal
16th-century establishments in Nepal
18th-century disestablishments in Nepal
Chaubisi Rajya
Former kingdoms